This is a list of industrial metal bands and bands that have played industrial metal at some time in their career. The bands that have been highlighted in bold perform this music as its primary genre, the bands in regular font have it as a featured genre among others.

1−9

 16Volt
 2wo
 3Teeth

A

 Aborym
 Abruptum
 Abu Lahab
 Acumen Nation
 Agoraphobic Nosebleed
 Alice Cooper (Brutal Planet)
 The Amenta
 American Head Charge
 Anaal Nathrakh 
 Angelspit
 Anorexia Nervosa
 Apartment 26
 Apollyon Sun
 Architects
 Argyle Park
 Arkaea
 The Armed
 Asguard
 ASP
 Atrocity
 The Austerity Program
 Author & Punisher
 Autokrator
 The Axis of Perdition

B

 Battle Beast
 Belfegore
 Benea Reach
 The Berzerker
 The Beyond
 Bile
 Blacklodge
 Bizarra Locomotiva
 Black Light Burns
 Black Magnet
 Blood from the Soul
 Blood Stain Child
 Blue Stahli
 Blut Aus Nord
 Boredoms
 Boris
 The Browning

C

 Cable Regime
 Car Bomb
 Celldweller
 Cenobita
 Chat Pile
 Chemlab (Burn Out)
 Circle of Dust
 Clawfinger
 The Clay People
 Cloudkicker
 Code Orange
 Combichrist
 Course of Empire
 Crossbreed
 Crossfaith
 Cruentus
 Cubanate
 Curse of the Golden Vampire
 Cyanotic
 Cypecore

D

 Daath
 Dagoba
 Danzig (Blackacidevil)
 Davey Suicide
 Dawn of Ashes
 Daughters
 Deadstar Assembly
 Deadsy
 D.E.N.Y.
 Deathstars
 Death Therapy
 D'espairsRay
 Device
 Devin Townsend
 Diatribe
 Die Kur
 Die Krupps
 Dir En Grey
 Dirge
 Dkay.com
 Dødheimsgard
 Dominion III
 Doom
 Dope
 Dope Stars Inc.
 Draconic
 Dragged Into Sunlight
 dreDDup
 Drumcorps

E

 Earth
 Econoline Crush
 Emigrate
 Engel
 Enter Shikari
 Eisbrecher
 Erra

F

 Fall of Because
 Fear Factory
 Filter
 Freak XXI
 Fredrik Thordendal
 Front Line Assembly (Millennium)
 Froutierer
 Full of Hell

G

 Genghis Tron
 Genitorturers
 Genkaku Allergy
 Ghost Machine
 Gigantic Brain
 Girls Under Glass
 GISM
 Gnaw
 Gnaw Their Tongues
 God
 God Lives Underwater
 Godhead
 Godflesh
 Gothminister
 Gravity Kills
 Greymachine

H

 Halo
 Hanzel und Gretyl
 Havoc Unit
 Heldmaschine
 Henry's Anger
 Hieronymus Bosch
 Hollywood Undead
 Human Impact

I

 Ice
 Igorrr
 Illidiance
 Info
 Infected
 Intricate Unit
 Interlock
 In This Moment
 Isis

J

 Janus
 Jesu
 Jesus on Extasy
 Julien-K (later)

K

 KeeN
 Kekal
 Khanate
 Khlyst
 Kidneythieves
 Kill the Thrill
 Killing Joke (later)
 Kim Dracula
 King Crimson (later)
 Klank
 KMFDM
 Knorkator
 Kobong
 The Kovenant
 Koyi k utho
 Kryoburn
 Kreator (90's)

L

 Laibach
 Lard
 Legacy of Fire
 Letzte Instanz
 Lindemann
 Liturgy
 Loathe
 Locrian
 The Locust
 Ludovico Technique

M

 Machinae Supremacy
 Maerzfeld
 Malhavoc
 Man is the Bastard
 Manntra
 Mass Hysteria
 Marilyn Manson
 Monster Voodoo Machine
 The Mad Capsule Markets
 Meathook Seed
 Megaherz
 Meshuggah
 Ministry
 Misery Loves Co.
 Mnemic
 Moi dix Mois
 Mortal
 Motionless in White
 Motograter
 Murder Inc.
 Mushroomhead

N

 N17
 Nadja
 Nailbomb
 The Named
 Napalm Death (90s)
 Necromance
 Nekrogoblikon
 Nine Inch Nails
 No-Big-Silence

O

 Oberschlesien
 Obszön Geschöpf
 October File
 OLD
 Omega Lithium
 Oomph!
 Optimum Wound Profile
 Orgy
 Ost+Front
 Our Last Enemy
 Oxxxymiron
 OvO

P

 Pain
 Painflow
 Passcode
 Periphery
 Phantomsmasher
 Pitchshifter
 Portal
 Powerman 5000
 Porcelain and the Tramps
 Prick
 Primitive Man
 Prong
 Psyclon Nine
 Punish Yourself

Q
 Queenadreena
 Queensrÿche (Promised Land era)

R

 Radio Iodine
 Rabbit Junk
 Rammstein
 Raubtier
 Raunchy
 Revolting Cocks (later)
 Ritual Aesthetic
 Rob Zombie
 Rorschach Test
 Red Harvest (later)
 Rublood
 Ruoska

S

 Scum of the Earth
 Schnitt Acht
 Satarial
 Samael
 Scorn
 Sirrah
 Silent Descent
 Sikth
 Sissy Spacek
 Sub Dub Micromachine
 Skillet
 Skin Chamber
 Skullflower
 Skrew
 SLAB!
 Sleepytime Gorilla Museum
 Snake River Conspiracy
 Society 1
 Solefald
 Sonic Mayhem
 Sonic Violence
 Sore Throat
 Spahn Ranch
 Spineshank
 Shotgun Messiah (later)
 Stabbing Westward
 Stahlhammer
 Stahlmann
 Static-X
 Stiff Valentine
 Strapping Young Lad
 Sturmgeist
 Sunn O)))
 Sybreed
 Synthetic Breed
 Swamp Terrorists

T

 Tanzwut
 Terminal Choice
 Tesseract
 Theatre of Tragedy
 Therapy?
 The Body
 The Defiled
 The GazettE
 The Gerogerigegege
 The Shizit
 Thorns
 Thou
 Treponem Pal
 Tristwood
 Trigger
 Turmion Kätilöt
 Type O Negative
 Theatres Des Vampires
 The Electric Hellfire Club

U

 Ultraspank
 Ulver
 Undercover Slut
 Uneven Structure
 Uniform
 The Union Underground

V

 Vampires Everywhere!
 Velcra
 Varga
 Voivod
 Vola
 Voodoocult

W

 White Zombie

We Butter the Bread with Butter
Woe, Is Me

Y

 You and What Army
 The Young Gods
 Youth Code

Z

 Zaraza
 Zardonic
 Zeromancer

See also
List of industrial music bands
List of electro-industrial bands
List of groove metal bands
List of nu metal bands
List of progressive metal bands
List of metalcore bands
List of djent bands
List of mathcore bands
List of grindcore bands
List of gothic metal bands
List of heavy metal bands

References

http://www.allmusic.com/

Industrial
 
Industrial metal